Oskari Brynolf Reinikainen (1 December 1885, Parikkala – 12 November 1969) was a Finnish physician and politician. He served as Deputy Minister of Social Affairs from 12 March 1937 to 1 December 1939. Reinikainen was a Member of the Parliament of Finland from 1919 to 1945, representing the Social Democratic Party of Finland (SDP).

References

1885 births
1969 deaths
People from Parikkala
People from Viipuri Province (Grand Duchy of Finland)
Social Democratic Party of Finland politicians
Government ministers of Finland
Members of the Parliament of Finland (1919–22)
Members of the Parliament of Finland (1922–24)
Members of the Parliament of Finland (1924–27)
Members of the Parliament of Finland (1927–29)
Members of the Parliament of Finland (1929–30)
Members of the Parliament of Finland (1930–33)
Members of the Parliament of Finland (1933–36)
Members of the Parliament of Finland (1936–39)
Members of the Parliament of Finland (1939–45)
Finnish people of World War II
University of Helsinki alumni
Place of death missing